Sharps may refer to:

 Plural form of many of the terms as defined on Sharp (disambiguation)
 Sharps waste, a form of biomedical waste composed of used sharps
 Sharps, Virginia, unincorporated community in Richmond County
 Sharps Bedrooms
 Sharp's Brewery, Rock, Cornwall, UK (cask conditioned beer brewery)
 Sharps rifle
 Sharps Rifle Manufacturing Company, a firearms company

Streams
 Sharps Creek (Kansas), in McPherson County
 Sharps Creek (Oregon), in Lane County
 Sharps Run (New Jersey), a stream in New Jersey
 Sharps Run (Cow Creek), a stream in West Virginia

People with the surname Sharps
 Christian Sharps (1810–1874), American firearms designer
Ian Sharps (born 1980), English footballer

Other
 Supporters for the Health And Rights of People in the Semiconductor Industry, SHARPS
 Systematic hierarchical approach for resilient process screening, (SHARPS)

See also
 Sharpe (disambiguation)
 Sharpie (disambiguation)